Sir David de la Hay (c. 1318–1346) was Lord High Constable of Scotland.

David was a son of Nicholas de la Haye. He succeeded to his grandfather Gilbert de la Hay's titles after David's father died at the battle of Dupplin Moor on 10–11 August 1332. He married a daughter of Sir John Keith of Innerpeffer, Lady Margaret Innerpeffer Keith.

David was killed at the Battle of Neville's Cross on 17 October 1346. He was succeeded by his son Thomas de la Haye.

External links
article on Hay family

Scottish deaths at the Battle of Neville's Cross
1318 births
1346 deaths
Lord High Constables of Scotland
David
14th-century Scottish people
Medieval Scottish knights
People of the Wars of Scottish Independence